Maria Heim (born 16 August 1970) is a Swiss former racing cyclist. She was the Swiss National Road Race champion in 1996.

References

External links

1966 births
Living people
Swiss female cyclists
Place of birth missing (living people)